Irene "Rena" Koumioti is a Greek musician. She has also appeared briefly on cinema and television.

Biography
Koumioti was born in the Nea Ionia district of Athens Her father was a refugee from Constantinople (Istanbul) and her mother a refugee from Smyrna (Izmir).

Koumioti is one of the foremost representatives of the Greek New Wave genre. Her breakthrough came when in 1968 while singing at the Apanemia musical club in Athens, she was heard by Lefteris Papadopoulos who then asked her to sing with Giannis Poulopoulos for the Dromos (Greek: , "The road") album.

Her discographical career was short —last album recording was in 1980— but important; for a period she had moved to Canada where she stayed for eight years. She remains active in live performance.

Discography
The discography of Rena Koumioti, including third party albums and collections, is the following:

1969 - 
1969 - 
1970 - 
1970 - 
1970 - 
1970 - 
1970 - 
1971 - 
1972 - 
1972 - 
1972 - 
1973 - 
1973 - 
1974 - 
1974 - 
1974 - 
1974 - 
1976 - 
1976 - 
1978 - 
1978 - 
1980 - 
1985 - 
1986 - 
1992 - 
1993 - 
1993 - 
1995 - 
1996 - 
1996 - 
2001 - 
2009 - 
2009 -

TV and Cinema Performances
Koumioti has played some roles in cinema and television. She has e.g. played a role in the cinematic films  and  along Rena Vlachopoulou; a relatively recent role on television is in the Greek TV series Dyo Xenoi where she briefly played herself.

See also
Arleta
Keti Chomata
Mariza Koch

References

External links

Living people
20th-century Greek women singers
Musicians from Athens
1948 births